Nikolay Valeryevich Skvortsov (born 28 March 1984 in Obninsk) is a butterfly swimmer from Russia, who won a silver and a bronze medal at the 2004 European Championships in Madrid, Spain. He swam for Russia at the 2004 Summer Olympics, where he finished in seventh place in the 200 fly.  At the 2008 Summer Olympics, he swam in the 100m and 200m butterfly and the 4 × 100 m medley relay, finishing in 20th, 8th and 4th respectively.  At the 2012 Summer Olympics, he swam in the same three events, finishing in 10th, 14th and 12th respectively.

References
 

1984 births
Living people
Russian male swimmers
Male butterfly swimmers
Olympic swimmers of Russia
Swimmers at the 2004 Summer Olympics
Swimmers at the 2008 Summer Olympics
Swimmers at the 2012 Summer Olympics
World record setters in swimming
World Aquatics Championships medalists in swimming
Medalists at the FINA World Swimming Championships (25 m)
European Aquatics Championships medalists in swimming